Qaidi Band is a 2017 Indian musical drama film, it revolves around seven innocent under-trials, who give a band performance in the prison to get into the good books of the authorities and secure their acquittal. It features newcomers Aadar Jain and Anya Singh in lead roles.

The film released on 25 August 2017.

Plot
The film opens in a jail of India where in the male ward, a bunch of under-trail prisoners are trying to catch a mouse, which ends up becoming a betting game for all the other prisoners. Sanji the under-trail prisoner who successfully catches the mouse takes his share and leaves. Meanwhile, in the girls ward, Bindu an under-trail prisoner is illegally earning money by providing her fellow prisoners with eyebrow cutting and manicure services. A senior prisoner refuses to pay her and Bindu angrily steals money from her and runs. The other girls chase her and thrash her brutally for her antics.

All the prisoners are called by the jailer SP Dhulia who announces that for the first time on the occasion of Independence Day of India, a male-female joint musical band of under-trail prisoners will be created to participate in the Independence Day function. He also announced that the band will be rewarded with grace points, which will help them to get their jail sentences cleared at the earliest. Subsequently, auditions happen and Sanju and Bindu are selected for the band along with Maskeen Singh, Ogu, Rufi, Tatyana and Sange. The group bonds quickly and decide to give their best to get their jail charges cleared as soon as possible, as per the promise of Dhulia. They also reveal their reasons for being imprisoned. Sanju has been framed by the husband of a woman whom he had given lift on a rainy night to reach home, of trying to molest her. Bindu was accused of trying to kidnap her niece by her brother-in-law who actually was indulging in violence with his wife and daughter. Rufi reveals that after his wedding, he purchased a car which got stolen. After a few days, he discovered that the bomb blast in his city was triggered from his car. Since he hadn't registered a missing complaint of his car, he is framed for being a part of a terrorist group. Ogu is imprisoned for trying to procure drugs in Goa.

Cast
 Aadar Jain as Sanju
 Anya Singh as Bindu
 Sachin Pilgaonkar as Dhulia
 Mikhail Yawalkar as Rufi
 Prince Parvinder Singh as Maskeen Singh
 Peter Muxka Manuel as Ogu
 Cyndy Khojol as Sangey
 Ram Kapoor as Naveen Vachani
 Anna Ador as Tatyana
 Lin Laishram
 Chhavi Awasthi as prisoner
 Ashi Singh as Tulika: The jailer's daughter
 Raman Khatri as Minister
 Deepika Dhulkotiya as Shopkeeper

Soundtrack

The lyrics for the songs have been written by Kausar Munir, Habib Faisal, Peter Muxka Manuel and Sidhant Mago. All the songs featured in the film are sung by Arijit Singh and Yashita Sharma. The soundtrack consists of 9 songs and was released on 26 July 2017 by YRF Music.

Critical reception 
The film received mixed reviews from critics. A review in Hindustan Times gave the film a 2 out of 5 rating but praised the composer stating, "the genius of music composer Amit Trivedi, who is the real star of this interesting yet ordinary film."

References

External links

 Official website

2017 films
2010s musical drama films
2010s Hindi-language films
2010s prison films
Indian prison films
Indian musical drama films
Films scored by Amit Trivedi
Yash Raj Films films
2017 drama films